Donald Abenheim (born 9. April 1953 in San Francisco) is an American military historian. 
Abenheim received a PhD degree in European history from Stanford University in 1985 and founded the Center for Civil Military Relations (CCMR) at the Naval Postgraduate School.

References 

1953 births
Living people
American military historians
Naval Postgraduate School faculty
Stanford University alumni